Alfonso Lacadena García-Gallo (August 21, 1964 – February 9, 2018), was a Spanish archaeologist, historian and epigraphist, one of the greatest experts in Mayan culture, researcher and specialist in writing and deciphering its texts. He was also a professor at the Complutense University of Madrid.

Biography 
Born in Zaragoza, Lacadena was a specialist in Mesoamerican indigenous written sources, Mayan linguistics, Nahuatl writing and comparative Mesoamerican literature. An author of numerous monographs on these topics, he had a Doctor in History and was awarded the Extraordinary Doctorate Award (Academic year 1994-1995) of the Faculty of Geography and History of the Complutense University for his doctoral thesis on Mayan handwriting. On October 13, 2011, the Peabody Museum of Archaeology and Ethnology, from Harvard University, awarded him the Tatiana Proskuriakof Prize for his contributions to the decipherment of Mayan and Nahuatl writing.

Lacadena worked with the Ch'orti ethnic group in eastern Guatemala, near Honduras. He dug in the ruins of Matxakila, in the Petén jungle. He studied hieroglyphic texts at Ek Balam, about 50 kilometers from Chichén Itzá. He also taught numerous epigraphy courses at both the Autonomous University of Madrid and the Autonomous University of Yucatán as well as at the National Autonomous University of Mexico.

He was author of two own works, seven co-works and five articles.  In October 2017, the III Meeting of Gramotology honored him for his work at the National Autonomous University of Mexico. Married, he was father of two children. He died of cancer on 9 February 2018, aged 53.

References

1964 births
2018 deaths
Mayanists
Mesoamerican epigraphers
Spanish Mesoamericanists
Nahuatl
20th-century Spanish historians
Complutense University of Madrid alumni
Deaths from cancer in Spain
21st-century Spanish historians
People from Zaragoza